4Ten (Hangul:포텐, formerly POTEN), commonly stylized as 4TEN, is a South Korean girl group formed by Jungle Entertainment in 2014. The group currently consists of three members: Hyeji, Hyejin and Heeo.

Name
The group debuted under the name 4TEN in 2014. The name comes from the word "potential".

In 2015, the group changed their name to POTEN after having revealed a new line-up with five members. The new name also has the same acronym of their original name. The group later changed their name back to 4TEN  after continuing as quartet.

Career

2014–2015: Debut with "Tornado", "Why", Line-up changes and "Go Easy"
4Ten released their debut single, "Tornado", on August 26, 2014. The group made their official debut stage on Mnet's M! Countdown two days later, on August 28.

4Ten released their second digital single, "Why", on January 5, 2015. They performed their comeback stage on KBS2's Music Bank. The music video for the song was shot in New York City.

On June 19, Jungle Entertainment announced that TEM and Eujin had left the group, and that the group was adding three new members: Heeo, Yun and Hajeong. The group also changed their name to Poten. They released their third digital single, "Go Easy", on July 3, 2015, and performed the next day at Yongsan Garrison for the annual 4th of July celebration.

2016: Hajeong's departure, Jack of All Trades and Yun's surgery
In early 2016, member Hajeong made her departure and the group continued on as a quartet under name 4TEN.

On February 23, 4Ten released their first mini-album Jack of All Trades. The same day, they had their comeback stage on SBS MTV's The Show.

On September 11, Yun announced through a hand-written letter on the groups fancafe that she was soon to get surgery, which she revealed was the reason for a delayed comeback. In the letter she explained that she had suffered from neck pain before debuting with 4Ten. The surgery took place on September 27 and was confirmed to have gone well, with Yun started recovering without any complications.

2017–present: Line-Up changes, 'Mix Nine' and Makestar
4Ten was inactive for almost a year after their Severely promotions finished in fall 2016.

After not seeing Yun participate on Mix Nine and an absence from the group for more than a year, it's been assumed that she has left. She has also not been a part of recent promotions for their comeback. 

During November and December 2017, Jungle Entertainment trainee Jisoo, 4Ten members Hyeji, Hyejin and Heeo were participating on YG's survival show Mix Nine but were eliminated. 

In March 2018, it was announced that the group would be having a comeback, and that they had launched a Makestar project to gauge interest.

Members

Current
 Jeong Hye-ji (Hangul: 정혜지)
 Kwak Hee-o (곽히오)
 Baek Hye-jin (백혜진)

Former
 TEM (탬)
 Eujin (유진)
 Hajeong (하정)
 Yun (윤)

Timeline

Discography

Extended plays

Singles

References

External links
 

Jungle Entertainment
Jungle Entertainment artists
K-pop music groups
Musical groups established in 2014
2014 establishments in South Korea
Musical groups from Seoul
South Korean girl groups
South Korean pop music groups
South Korean dance music groups